Dexter James Kerstetter (December 21, 1907 – July 9, 1972) was a United States Army soldier and a recipient of the United States military's highest decoration—the Medal of Honor—for his actions in World War II.

Biography
Kerstetter joined the Army from his birthplace of Centralia, Washington in March 1942, and by April 13, 1945, was serving as a private first class in Company C, 130th Infantry Regiment, 33rd Infantry Division. On that day, during a fight to take a ridge near Galiano, Luzon, the Philippines, he advanced ahead of his squad and engaged the Japanese soldiers alone until running out of ammunition. For these actions, he was awarded the Medal of Honor seven months later, on November 1, 1945. He left the army with the rank of sergeant.

Medal of Honor citation
Private First Class Kerstetter official Medal of Honor citation reads:
He was with his unit in a dawn attack against hill positions approachable only along a narrow ridge paralleled on each side by steep cliffs which were heavily defended by enemy mortars, machineguns, and rifles in well-camouflaged spider holes and tunnels leading to caves. When the leading element was halted by intense fire that inflicted 5 casualties, Pfc. Kerstetter passed through the American line with his squad. Placing himself well in advance of his men, he grimly worked his way up the narrow steep hogback, meeting the brunt of enemy action. With well-aimed shots and rifle-grenade fire, he forced the Japs to take cover. He left the trail and moving down a cliff that offered only precarious footholds, dropped among 4 Japs at the entrance to a cave, fired his rifle from his hip and killed them all. Climbing back to the trail, he advanced against heavy enemy machinegun, rifle, and mortar fire to silence a heavy machinegun by killing its crew of 4 with rifle fire and grenades. He expended his remaining ammunition and grenades on a group of approximately 20 Japs, scattering them, and returned to his squad for more ammunition and first aid for his left hand, which had been blistered by the heat from his rifle. Resupplied, he guided a fresh platoon into a position from which a concerted attack could be launched, killing 3 hostile soldiers on the way. In all, he dispatched 16 Japs that day. The hill was taken and held against the enemy's counterattacks, which continued for 3 days. Pfc. Kerstetter's dauntless and gallant heroism was largely responsible for the capture of this key enemy position, and his fearless attack in the face of great odds was an inspiration to his comrades in their dangerous task.

See also

List of Medal of Honor recipients
List of Medal of Honor recipients for World War II

References

External links

 Photograph of Kerstetter and Truman at the Medal of Honor ceremony October 12, 1945

1907 births
1972 deaths
United States Army personnel of World War II
United States Army Medal of Honor recipients
People from Centralia, Washington
United States Army soldiers
World War II recipients of the Medal of Honor
Burials at Tahoma National Cemetery